Jide Orire is a Nigerian Pentecostal bishop who was born in 1963. He is the general overseer of Save and Serve Christ Family Church in Ibadan.he was born in orire Royal family in Modakeke  He is a prophet, a husband and  father.

References

External links
Save and Serve Christ Family Church website

1963 births
Living people
Nigerian bishops
Nigerian Pentecostal pastors
Place of birth missing (living people)